Gonzalo Andrés Lama Feliu (born 27 April 1993 in Santiago) is a Chilean tennis player. His best singles ranking was 160 in June 2016. He has won two Challengers (Cali and São Paulo), along with fourteen futures, twelve in singles and two in doubles.

Career

He has defeated top 100 players such as Santiago Giraldo, Robin Haase, Alejandro González, Víctor Estrella, Pere Riba, Boris Pašanski, Blaz Kavcic, Potito Starace and Roberto Carballés Baena.

Finals

Singles

Doubles

External links 
 
 
 
 

1993 births
Living people
Chilean male tennis players
Tennis players from Santiago
South American Games bronze medalists for Chile
South American Games medalists in tennis
Competitors at the 2018 South American Games
20th-century Chilean people
21st-century Chilean people